The American,  The Flag Maker, is a lost 1927 American silent Western film directed by J. Stuart Blackton and starring Bessie Love and Charles Ray. It was based on the short story "The Flag Maker" by Jewel Spencer, and was produced by George K. Spoor through his company Natural Vision Pictures.

The film, made in the experimental widescreen process Natural Vision, developed by Spoor and P. John Berggren, was never released theatrically.

Plot 
A rich Turk Seref is released from an American prison after 20 years, with plans to exact revenge on the fiancee who had betrayed him.

Cast

Production 

The Natural Vision process required the action to be filmed on two cameras: one for production and one for the dailies. The production camera was set back unusually far from the action, and subsequently filmed only wide shots and no close-ups.

Canceled release 

The film was slated for a March 1927 premiere at New York's Roxy Theatre, which was to have been equipped to show films in Natural Vision.

However, producer Spoor refused to release the film because it was "poorly made". Director Blackton protested, claiming that he had not been allowed to complete the picture, and had not been fully paid for his work.

See also 
 List of film formats
 Widescreen

References 
Citations

Works cited

External links 

 
 

1927 Western (genre) films
1927 lost films
1927 films
American black-and-white films
Films based on short fiction
Films directed by J. Stuart Blackton
Lost American films
Lost Western (genre) films
Unreleased American films
Silent American Western (genre) films
1920s American films